Tina Krajišnik (born January 12, 1991) is a Serbian basketball player for UMMC Ekaterinburg and for the Serbian national team.

Club career
On 18 May 2021, she signed a one-year contract with Galatasaray.

National Team Career
She participated at the EuroBasket Women 2017 and 2021 where they won the gold medal. She also participated in 2022 World Cup with Serbia coming in 6th place.

WNBA career statistics

Regular season

|-
| align="left" | 2022
| align="left" | Chicago
| 2 || 0 || 2.5 || .000 || .000 || .000 || 0.0 || 1.0 || 0.5 || 0.0 || 0.0 || 1.0
|-
| align="left" | Career
| align="left" | 1 year, 1 team
| 2 || 0 || 2.5 || .000 || .000 || .000 || 0.0 || 1.0 || 0.5 || 0.0 || 0.0 || 1.0

Achievements

National team
  2021 European Championship

Clubs
EuroLeague Women
 2017/18
EuroCup Women
 2021/22
Russian basketball SuperCup
 2022/23
Russian basketball Cup
 2022/23 
Hungarian League
 2017/18, 2018/19, 2020/21
Hungarian basketball Cup
 2015/16, 2018/19, 2019/20, 2020/21
 2017/18

Individual
 Serbian Player of the Year – 2022

See also 
 List of Serbian WNBA players

References

External links
 Tina Krajisnik-Jovanovic at Regeneracomsports.com

1991 births
Living people
Serbian women's basketball players
Basketball players from Sarajevo
Serbs of Bosnia and Herzegovina
Power forwards (basketball)
Serbian expatriate basketball people in Hungary
Serbian expatriate basketball people in Turkey
Serbian expatriate basketball people in the United States
European champions for Serbia
Galatasaray S.K. (women's basketball) players
Olympic basketball players of Serbia
Basketball players at the 2020 Summer Olympics
Chicago Sky players
Women's National Basketball Association players from Serbia
Undrafted Women's National Basketball Association players